This is a list of transfers in Dutch football for the 2014 Summer transfer window. Only moves featuring an Eredivisie side are listed.

The summer transfer window will open on July 1, 2014, and will close on September 2. Deals may be signed at any given moment in the season, but the actual transfer may only take place during the transfer window. Unattached players may sign at any moment.

Notes
 Transfer will take place on 1 July 2014.

References

Football transfers summer 14
2014
Dutch